Shubert Theatre or Shubert Theater may refer to:

Shubert Theatre (Boston) (1910—), part of the Citi Performing Arts Center, Massachusetts
Shubert Theatre (Los Angeles) (1972–2002), California
Shubert Theatre (New Haven) (built in 1914), Connecticut
Shubert Theatre (Broadway) (built in 1913), New York
Shubert Theatre, former name of CIBC Theatre, Chicago, Illinois
Shubert Theatre, former name of Civic Theatre, New Orleans, Louisiana
Shubert-Lafayette Theatre (1925–1964), run by The Shubert Organization in Detroit, Michigan
Shubert Theatre, former name of the Goodale Theater; part of the Cowles Center for Dance and the Performing Arts in Minneapolis, Minnesota
Shubert Theatre, former name of the Fitzgerald Theater in St. Paul, Minnesota
Shubert Theatre (demolished in 1976), run by The Shubert Organization, Cincinnati, Ohio
Shubert Theatre, renamed the Miller Theater in Philadelphia, Pennsylvania

See also
Stage 42, formerly known as the Little Shubert Theatre, an off-Broadway theatre in New York City, New York
Schubert Theatre (Gooding, Idaho)
**

Lists of theatres